M.T. Padma (born 9 January 1943, Kannur) is a politician from the Indian state of Kerala.

Life

M.T. Padma was active in student politics, and served as vice president of the Kerala Students Union. She contested the 1982 Kerala Vidhan Sabha election as a Congress (I) candidate, but was not elected. She again contested the 1987 and 1991 elections, and was elected to represent the Koyilandy constituency. She served as Minister for Fisheries and Rural Development 1991-1995 and as Minister of Fisheries and Registration 1995–1996.

M.T. Padma contested the Palakkad seat in the 1999 Lok Sabha election, but was defeated by N.N. Krishnnadas by a margin of 30,000 votes. She contested the Vatakara seat in the 2004 Lok Sabha election, but was defeated by P. Sathidevi of the CPI(M) by a margin of more than 130,000 votes.

She later joined the Democratic Indira Congress (Karunakaran).

As of 2013, she was the Leader of the Opposition in the Kozhikode City Corporation.

References

Indian National Congress politicians from Kerala
1943 births
Living people
Politicians from Kannur
Kerala MLAs 1987–1991
Kerala MLAs 1991–1996
20th-century Indian women politicians
20th-century Indian politicians
Women members of the Kerala Legislative Assembly